Abuta candicans (syn. Abuta limaciifolia  Diels, Abuta pullei Diels, Chondrodendron limaciifolium (Diels) Moldenke, Chondrodendron candicans (Rich.) Sandwith, Curarea candicans (Rich. ex DC.) Barneby, Sciadotenia candicans (Rich.) Diels) is a species in the family Menispermaceae.

References

Abuta candicans

Menispermaceae
Plants described in 1817